John Barlow Jarvis (born January 2, 1954 in Pasadena, California) is an American songwriter, composer, session pianist and recording artist.  Before moving to Lake Tahoe in 2014, he had lived in Nashville, Tennessee since 1982.

Early career (1968–1982)

As a child, Jarvis was trained in classical music under Evelyn Hood in San Marino, California and won both the Southern California Bach Festival and first place in the California Music Teachers Composition Contest. He first began his professional musical career at the age of 14 when he was signed as a staff songwriter for Edwin H. Morris Music. By age 17, he was a staff piano player for Motown Records. He also toured with such 1960s bands as the Grass Roots and Hermans Hermits before landing the job of pianist in Rod Stewart's band in 1974. During this period he played on records by artists such as Ringo Starr, Harry Nilsson, Delbert McClinton, Air Supply, John Cougar Mellencamp, Leo Sayer, Art Garfunkel, Stephen Bishop and many more.

Studio work, composing and recording artist (1982–present)

Jarvis relocated from Los Angeles to Nashville in 1982 and continued with his studio career culminating in several nominations for both CMA and ACM musician of the year. The list of artists Jarvis has recorded with includes Garth Brooks, Tammy Wynette, Shania Twain, Dusty Springfield, Bob Seger, Hank Williams Jr, George Strait, Reba McEntire, Jimmy Buffett, Lionel Richie, Steve Earle, and more. He also played piano on the Elvis Presley Christmas Duets Album and performed with James Taylor for his Small World Tour. In 2011 Jarvis performed at the White House with James Taylor for the PBS special "In Performance at the White House". Jarvis has also performed on TV with Ray Charles and Sting.

While continuing his career as a recording pianist Jarvis also composed numerous songs resulting in country hits for Conway Twitty, Waylon Jennings, Steve Wariner and Kenny Rogers and Dolly Parton, culminating in being awarded 2 Grammy's for Song of the Year (1991-1992) for co-writing Vince Gill's biggest hit "I Still Believe In You" and The Judds' #1 hit "Love Can Build A Bridge".  His songwriting success has continued beyond country music with songs recorded by Stevie Nicks, Taj Mahal, Bad Company, Cher, Westlife and many more. In 1996 his song "The Flame" was the closing song at the Atlanta Olympics. Jarvis was also nominated for an Emmy for his score in the TV show "Expedition Earth". In 2015 Jarvis wrote music for the best selling video game "Fallout 4". He has also contributed 26 tracks to Band-in-a-Box, the automatic accompaniment software program.

Beginning in 1984, Jarvis recorded four albums for MCA Records. In 1993, he recorded his fifth album ("Balancing Act") for Liberty Records, and, in 2003, recorded his sixth album ("View From a Southern Porch") for Barlotone Productions.    Time Magazine named "Whatever Works" as one of the ten best pop records of 1988. and music from "So Fa So Good" was picked as theme music for the 1988 Winter Olympics in Calgary.

As of 2016, Jarvis continues to tour with the Vince Gill band, which also features Willie Weeks, Paul Franklin and Tom Bukovac. Jarvis continues to record, performing on works by Lynda Carter, Chris Botti and others.

Discography

Solo recordings
 So Fa So Good (MCA Master Series, 1985)
 Something Constructive (MCA Master Series, 1986)
 Whatever Works (CD) (MCA Master Series, 1988)
 Pure Contours (MCA Master Series, 1990)
 Balancing Act (Liberty Records, 1993)
 View From a Southern Porch (Barlotone Productions, 2003

References

External links
 John Barlow Jarvis on Twitter
 John Jarvis Discography at Discogs
 John Barlow Jarvis at AllMusic
 John Barlow Jarvis at CMT

1954 births
American country pianists
American male pianists
Grammy Award winners
Living people
American session musicians
Musicians from Nashville, Tennessee
Musicians from Pasadena, California
American country songwriters
American male songwriters
American rock pianists
American male organists
American rock keyboardists
American male composers
20th-century American composers
Songwriters from California
Songwriters from Tennessee
20th-century American pianists
Country musicians from California
Country musicians from Tennessee
21st-century American pianists
21st-century organists
20th-century American male musicians
21st-century American male musicians
21st-century American keyboardists
20th-century American keyboardists
Lyle Lovett and His Large Band members
American organists